State leaders in the 9th century BC – State leaders in the 7th century BC – State leaders by year

This is a list of state leaders in the 8th century BC (800–701 BC).

Africa: North

Carthage

Carthage (complete list) –
Dido, Queen (814–c.760 BC) 

Kush and Egypt's Third Intermediate Period

Twenty-second Dynasty of the Third Intermediate Period (complete list) –
Shoshenq III, Pharaoh (837–798 BC)
Shoshenq IV, Pharaoh (798–785 BC)
Pami, Pharaoh (785–778 BC)
Shoshenq V, Pharaoh (778–740 BC)
Pedubast II, Pharaoh (740–730 BC)
Osorkon IV, Pharaoh (730–716 BC)

Twenty-third Dynasty of the Third Intermediate Period (complete list) –
Shoshenq VI, Pharaoh (804–798 BC)
Osorkon III, Pharaoh (798–769 BC)
Takelot III, Pharaoh (774–759 BC)
Rudamun, Pharaoh (759–755 BC)
Ini, Pharaoh (755–750 BC)
Peftjauawybast, Pharaoh (754–720 BC)

Twenty-fourth Dynasty of the Third Intermediate Period (complete list) –
Tefnakhte I, Pharaoh (732–725 BC)
Bakenranef, Pharaoh (725–720 BC)

Kingdom of Kush (complete list) –
Alara, King (c.795–752 BC)
Kashta, King (c.765–752 BC)

Kush: Twenty-fifth Dynasty of the Third Intermediate Period (complete list) 
Kashta, Pharaoh (c.760–c.752 BC)
Piye, Pharaoh (c.752–721 BC)
Shabaka, Pharaoh (721–707 BC)
Shebitku, Pharaoh (707–690 BC)

Asia

Asia: East

China: Spring and Autumn period

Zhou, China: Eastern Zhou (complete list) –
Ping, King (770–720 BC)
Huan, King (719–697 BC)

Cai (complete list) –
Xi, Marquis (809–761 BC)
Gòng, Marquis (761–760 BC)
Dai, Marquis (759–750 BC)
Xuan, Marquis (749–715 BC)
Huan, Marquis (714–695 BC)

Cao (complete list) –
Hui, Count (794–760 BC)
Fei, Count (760–760 BC)
Mu, Duke (759–757 BC)
Huan, Duke (756–702 BC)
Zhuang, Duke (701–671 BC)

Chen (complete list) –
Ping, Duke (777–755 BC BC)
Wen, Duke (754–745 BC BC)
Huan, Duke (744–707 BC BC)
Tuo, usurper ruler (707–706 BC BC)
Li, Duke (706–700 BC BC)

Chu (complete list) –
Ruo'ao, ruler (790–764 BC)
Xiao'ao, ruler (763–758 BC)
Fenmao, ruler (757–741 BC)
Wu, King (740–690 BC)

Jin (complete list) –
Wen, Marquis (780–746 BC)
Zhao, Marquis (745–740 BC)
Xiao, Marquis (739–724 BC)
E, Marquis (723–718 BC)
Ai, Marquis (717–709 BC)
Xiaozi, Marquis (708–705 BC)
Min, Marquis (704–678 BC)

Lu (complete list) –
Xiao, Duke (795–769 BC)
Hui, Duke (768–723 BC)
Yin, Duke (722–712 BC)
Huan, Duke (711–694 BC)

Qi: House of Jiang (complete list) –
Zhuang I, Duke (794–731 BC)
Xi, Duke (730–698 BC)

Qin (complete list) –
Xiang, Duke (777–766 BC)
Wen, Duke (765–716 BC)
Xian, Duke (715–704 BC)
Chuzi I, Duke (703–698 BC)

Song (complete list) –
Dai, Duke (799–766 BC)
Wu, Duke (765–748 BC)
Xuan, Duke (747–729 BC)
Mu, Duke (728–720 BC)
Shang, Duke (719–711 BC)
Zhuang, Duke (710–692 BC)

Wey (complete list) –
Wu, Duke (812–758 BC)
Zhuang, Duke (757–735 BC)
Huan, Duke (734–719 BC)
Xuan, Duke (718–700 BC)

Zheng (complete list) –
Huan, Duke (806–771 BC)
Wu, Duke (770–744 BC)
Zhuang, Duke (743–701 BC)
Zhao, Duke (701 BC, 696–695 BC)

Asia: Southeast
Vietnam
Hồng Bàng dynasty (complete list) –
Kỷ line, (c.853–c.755 BC)
Canh line, King (c.754–c.661 BC)

Asia: South

Magadha of India —
Brihadratha dynasty
Ripunjaya, King (849–799 BC)
Pradyota Dynasty
Pradyota, King (779–776 BC)
Palaka, King (776–752 BC) 
Visakhayupa, King (752–702 BC) 
Janaka, King (702–681 BC)

Pradyota dynasty 
Pradyota
Palaka
Visakhayupa
Ajaka

Asia: West

Aram-Damascus (complete list) –
Hazael, King (c.842–800 BC)
Ben-Hadad III, King (796–792 BC)
Rezin, King (792–732 BC)

Elam: Humban-Tahrid dynasty (complete list) –
Humban-Tahrah I, King (?–743 BC)
Humban-Nikash I, King (743–717 BC)
Shutur-Nahhunte II, King (717–699 BC)

Diauehi –
Utupurshi, King (c.810–770 BC)

Tyre, Phoenecia — 
Pygmalion, King (831–785 BC), Dido founded Carthage during his reign.
Ithobaal II, King (750–739 BC) 
Hiram II, King (739–730 BC) 
Mattan II, King (730–729 BC)
Elulaios, King (729–694 BC)

Kingdom of Judah —
Chronologies as established by Albright
Jehoash, King (837–800 BC)
Amaziah, King (800–783 BC)
Uzziah (Azariah), King (783–742 BC)
Jotham, King (742–735 BC)
Ahaz, King (735–715 BC)
Hezekiah, King (715–687 BC)

Kingdom of (northern) Israel —
Chronologies as established by Albright
Joash/Jehoash, King (801–786 BC)
Jeroboam II, King (786–746 BC)
Zechariah, King (746 BC)
Shallum, King (745 BC)
Menahem, King (745–738 BC)
Pekahiah, King (738–737 BC)
Pekah, King (737–732 BC)
Hoshea, King (732–722 BC)

Assyria: Neo-Assyrian Period
Adad-nirari III (811–783 BC) 
Shalmaneser IV (783–773 BC) 
Ashur-Dan III (773–755 BC) 
Ashur-nirari V (755–745 BC) 
Tiglath-Pileser III (745–727 BC) 
Shalmaneser V (727–722 BC) 
Sargon II (722–705 BC) 
Sennacherib (705–681 BC)

Dynasty IX of Babylon 
Ninurta-apla-X, (c. 800–790 BC)
Marduk-bel-zeri, (c. 790–780 BC)
Marduk-apla-usur, (c. 780–769 BC)
Eriba-Marduk, (c. 769–761 BC)
Nabu-shuma-ishkun, (c. 761–748 BC)
Nabu-nasir (748–734 BC)
Nabu-nadin-zeri (734–732 BC)
Nabu-suma-ukin II (732 BC)

Dynasty X of Babylon, Neo-Assyrian Empire
Nabu-mukin-zeri (732–729 BC)
Tiglath-Pileser III (729–727 BC)
Shalmaneser V (727–722 BC)
Marduk-apla-iddina II (722–710 BC)
Sharrukin II (Sargon II) 710–705 BC)
Sin-ahhe-eriba (Sennacherib) 705–703 BC)
Marduk-zakir-shumi II (703 BC)
Marduk-apla-iddina II (703 BC) (restored)
Bel-ibni (703–700 BC)

Lydia (complete list) –
Meles, aka Myrsus (8th century BC)
Candaules, aka Myrsilus (died c.687 BC)

Urartu (complete list) –
Menua, King (810–785 BC)
Argishti I, King (785–763 BC)
Sarduri II, King (763–735 BC)
Rusa I, King (735–714 BC)
Argishti II, King (714–680 BC)

Europe

Europe: Balkans 

Athens (complete list) –
Thespieus, Life Archon (824–797 BC)
Agamestor, Life Archon (796–778 BC)
Aeschylus, Life Archon (778–755 BC)
Alcmaeon, Life Archon (755–753 BC)
Charops, Decennial Archon (753–743 BC)
Aesimides, Decennial Archon (743–733 BC)
Clidicus, Decennial Archon (733–723 BC)
Hippomenes, Decennial Archon (723–713 BC)
Leocrates, Decennial Archon (713–703 BC)

Sparta: Eurypontid dynasty (complete list) –
Polydectes, King (c.830–800 BC)
Eunomus, King (c.800–780 BC)
Charilaus, King (c. 780–750 BC)
Nicander, King (c.750–725 BC)
Theopompus, King (c.725–675 BC)

Europe: South

Roman Kingdom (complete list) –
Romulus, King (753–716 BC)
Numa Pompilius, King (716–672 BC)

References

State Leaders
-
8th-century BC rulers